is a Prefectural Natural Park in southwest Hokkaidō, Japan. Established in 1961, the park is within the municipality of Hakodate on the Oshima Peninsula.

References

External links
  Map of Natural Parks of Hokkaidō
  Map of Esan Prefectural Natural Park

Parks and gardens in Hokkaido
Protected areas established in 1961
1961 establishments in Japan